Dixonius minhlei is a species of lizard in the family Gekkonidae. The species is endemic to southern Vietnam.

Etymology
The specific name, minhlei, is in honor of Vietnamese herpetologist Minh Duc Le.

Geographic range
D. minhlei is found in Dong Nai Province, Vietnam.

Habitat
The preferred natural habitat of D. minhlei is forest.

Reproduction
The mode of reproduction of D. minhlei is unknown.

References

Further reading
Ziegler T, Botov A, Nguyen TT, Bauer AM, Brennan IG, Ngo HT, Nguyen QT (2016). "First molecular verification of Dixonius vietnamensis Das, 2004 (Squamata: Gekkonidae) with description of a new species from Vinh Cuu Nature Reserve, Dong Nai Province, Vietnam". Zootaxa 4136 (3): 553–566. (Dixonius minhlei, new species).

Dixonius
Reptiles described in 2016